The Respect Party was a left-wing political party in the United Kingdom, founded in 2004 and dissolved in 2016. Its name is a contrived acronym standing for: Respect, Equality, Socialism, Peace, Environmentalism, Community and Trade Unionism. The Respect Party was established in London in January 2004; it grew out of the Stop the War Coalition, opposing the Iraq War.

Parliamentary elections

By-elections, 2001–2005

2005 general election

Summary of results:
No. of candidates: 26
Votes received: 81,860
% of total votes: 0.25%
Vote as % of electorate: 0.15%
Vote as % in seats contested: 6.84%
Lost deposits: 17 at a cost of £8,500

Source:

2010 general election

Summary of results:
No. of candidates: 11
Votes received: 33,251
% of total votes: 0.11%
Vote as % of electorate: 0.07%
Vote as % in seats contested: 6.84%
Lost deposits: 8 at a cost of £4,000

Source:

By-elections, 2010–2015

2015 general election

Summary of results:
No. of candidates: 4
Votes received: 9,989
% of total votes: 0.03%
Vote as % of electorate: 0.07%
Vote as % in seats contested: 5.80%
Lost deposits: 3 at a cost of £1,500

References

Election results by party in the United Kingdom